The Journal of Dharma is a quarterly peer-reviewed academic journal covering discussion and debates on philosophies and religions. It was established in 1975 and is published by Dharmaram Vidya Kshetram. The editor-in-chief is Jose Nandhikkara (Dharmaram Vidya Kshetram).  Besides regular articles, the journal also includes book reviews of recently released books in philosophy.

Abstracting and indexing
The journal is abstracted and indexed in:
ATLA Religion Database
Arts and Humanities Citation Index
Current Contents/Arts & Humanities
Philosopher's Index
Scopus

References

External links

Philosophy journals
Religious studies journals
Publications established in 1975
English-language journals
Quarterly journals